Saqib Zulfiqar (born 28 March 1997) is a Dutch cricketer. He made his List A debut for the Netherlands against the United Arab Emirates on 17 July 2017. In the match, he played alongside his brothers Asad and Sikander, becoming the first instance of triplets playing for a professional cricket team in the same game. He made his first-class debut for the Netherlands in the 2015–17 ICC Intercontinental Cup on 15 August 2017.

International career
In June 2018, he was named in the Netherlands' Twenty20 International (T20I) squad for the 2018 Netherlands Tri-Nation Series. He made his T20I debut for the Netherlands against Ireland on 12 June 2018.

In June 2019, he was named in the Netherlands' One Day International (ODI) squad for their series against Zimbabwe. He made his ODI debut for the Netherlands against Zimbabwe on 21 June 2019. In April 2020, he was one of seventeen Dutch-based cricketers to be named in the team's senior squad.

T20 career
In July 2019, he was selected to play for the Rotterdam Rhinos in the inaugural edition of the Euro T20 Slam cricket tournament. However, the following month the tournament was cancelled.

References

External links
 

1997 births
Living people
Dutch cricketers
Netherlands One Day International cricketers
Netherlands Twenty20 International cricketers
Place of birth missing (living people)
Triplets
Dutch people of Pakistani descent